Roger Mompesson (c. 1661 – 1715) was a Member of Parliament for Southampton who also held many judicial and legislative offices in British North America.

Biography
Born around 1661, Roger Mompesson was the son of George Mompesson and Elizabeth Clavell. He was educated at Magdalen Hall, Oxford, and was a lawyer.

He was appointed Recorder of Southampton in May 1668, and was elected to Parliament in 1669. Mompesson served as MP for Southampton until the election of November 1701, when he lost his seat. He did not stand for election in 1702. In 1703 his recordership was declared void due to neglect.

Mompesson had become involved in engagements to pay some debts incurred by his father; this placed him in an embarrassing situation. In April 1703 he accepted an appointment as Judge of the Vice Admiralty for Connecticut, Massachusetts, New Hampshire, New Jersey, New York, Rhode Island and Pennsylvania. As he was appointed Chief Justice of New York in July 1704 he gave up four of the colonies, retaining New York, New Jersey and Connecticut until his death in 1715.

In October 1704 Roger Mompesson was appointed as the first chief justice of New Jersey and, with the exception of a few months during the administration of Lord Lovelace, held office until 14 February 1710. In February 1705 he was sworn of the New York Provincial Council, and on 29 November 1705 he was appointed to a seat on the New Jersey Provincial Council representing the Eastern Division; he held seats in both Councils until his death.

In April 1706 he was appointed Chief Justice of Pennsylvania, but no evidence exists that he ever entered upon his duties there.

References

External links
The History of Parliament, MOMPESSON, Roger (c.1661-1715), of Lincoln’s Inn, London and Durnford, Dorset

Members of the New Jersey Provincial Council
Chief Justices of the Supreme Court of New Jersey
Chief Justices of Pennsylvania
Members of Lincoln's Inn
English MPs 1698–1700
English MPs 1701
Members of the Parliament of England for Southampton
1660s births
1715 deaths